Portrait of Paul Lemoyne is an oil on canvas painting by the French Neoclassical artist Jean-Auguste-Dominique Ingres, completed between 1810-1811. It his held at the Nelson-Atkins Museum of Art, Kansas City. The model is Paul Lemoyne (1784-1883), a French sculptor, who visited Ingres during his first stay in Rome, when this portrait was executed. He is depicted as youthful, dashing, fiery, dark and handsome. Lemoyne is shown in an unguarded and informal pose, suggesting that the work completed as a gift for a friend rather than as a paid commission. The dark black and green background seems splashed on, and serves to accentuate the subject's dark facial features and black hair. Lemoyne looks disheveled, with rough hair and open shirt collars.

Notes

Sources

 Tinterow, Gary. Portraits by Ingres: Image of an Epoch. New York: Metropolitan Museum of Art, 1999.

Links
  Painting in the collection of The Nelson-Atkins Museum of Art 

Portraits by Jean-Auguste-Dominique Ingres
1810 paintings